Bhakkiyaraj (31 October 1980 – 2 September 2022), popularly known by his stage name, Bamba Bakya, was an Indian Tamil playback singer and musician. He predominantly worked alongside music composer A. R. Rahman on numerous collaborations in films. He received the name Bamba Bakya after A. R. Rahman asked him to sing songs for him just like popular South African musician Bamba. It later went onto become a stage name as well as an identity of him. He was well known for his unique baritone.

A. R. Rahman included him in the 2010 film Raavanan, during which he sang in the song "Kedakkari" (at the time he was credited as Bhakyaraj).

Career 
Bakya made his debut as a playback singer in S. Shankar's directorial 2.0 and sang his first single titled "Pullinangal" which became an instant hit and became a chartbuster. Prior to his entry into film industry, he mostly sang devotional songs. Prior to his untimely demise, he also rendered his voice for Mani Ratnam's historical drama film Ponniyin Selvan: I.

Death 
Bakya died on 2 September 2022, 8 weeks before his 42nd birthday due to cardiac arrest. He had been admitted to a hospital at Chennai after he complained of having a severe chest pain.

Discography

References

External links 
 
 

1972 births

2022 deaths
21st-century Indian male singers
21st-century Indian singers
Tamil playback singers
Indian male playback singers
Singers from Tamil Nadu
Indian male folk singers
Indian folk singers
Musicians from Tamil Nadu